"It's Only Life" is a song performed by The Shins, issued as the second single from their album Port of Morrow. The song was written by the band's lead singer James Mercer.

Critical reception
The song has received mixed to positive reviews from critics. Brendan of MusicUnderFire praised Mercer's skills in writing the song and further stated that the song "smashes [the previous single] to pieces". Matt from A Heart is a Spade considered the song a "heart-on-sleeve" track and called its accompanying video "sentimental". Conversely, Michael Roffman of Consequence of Sound gave the song a negative review, stating that the song is "the sort of sappy fluff whose plasticity poisons a genre".

Music video

The official music video for the song was directed by Hiro Murai.

Live performances

The band has performed the song on the Late Show with David Letterman and Saturday Night Live.

References

External links
 
 

2011 songs
2012 singles
Columbia Records singles
The Shins songs
Songs written by James Mercer (musician)
Rock ballads